Ted Reilly (born 14 September 1991) is a British actor, who played the role of Johnny Carter in EastEnders from 2016–2018, because the original actor chose not to return, and the show's producers recast the role. Before that, however, he appeared in popular television programmes, including Casualty, Law & Order: UK, Grantchester and Call the Midwife. Reilly quit EastEnders in December 2017, and his final scenes aired on 29 January 2018.

Career
Reilly made his acting debut during an episode on Casualty as Danni Petrovich in "Life Goes On". He later went on to appear in the short Heart of Nowhere as Dropkick 2. He has also appeared in the first ever episode of television series Suspects as Robbie Hyland in 2014. Later in the year, he appeared in Law and Order UK as Paul Downing, Playhouse Presents for one episode as Daniel Pettigrew. He also appeared in the short Half Time and Down as Teddy, and in Grantchester as Justin during the first series' fifth episode. In 2016, he appeared as Ian Bulmer for one episode in Call the Midwife and in April made his EastEnders debut before making an appearance in the short Party Party.

Reilly made his debut appearance as Johnny Carter on 11 April 2016. The role was previously portrayed by Sam Strike.

Reilly appears as school boy Henry in LGBT short film Birthday Boy (2021) directed by NFTS alumnus Leo Lebeau.

Filmography

Television

Film

References

External links

 
Agent Profile

Living people
British male actors
1991 births
21st-century British male actors
English male soap opera actors
People from Lambeth